Burnt by the Sun is the first EP by metalcore band Burnt by the Sun, released on Relapse Records.

Track listing
 "Buffy"
 "You Will Move"
 "Lizard-Skin Barbie"
 "The Fish Under the Sea Dance"

Personnel
Mike Olender- vocals
John Adubato - guitar
Paul Miller - guitar
Ted Patterson - bass
Dave Witte - drums

Burnt by the Sun (band) albums
2001 EPs